Yang Cheng-hsing (born 19 August 1973) is a former Taiwanese football player. He had been Chinese Taipei's first-choice goalkeeper for more than 10 years and sometimes been called the Taiwanese Chilavert. In his international career, he once scored a penalty, also his first goal for Chinese Taipei, in East Asian Cup 2003 qualifiers against Mongolia. It made him the first Taiwanese goalkeeper who had scored in international competitions. At club level, he had played for Taiwan Power Company F.C. He retired in 2004.

International goals

References

1973 births
Living people
Taiwan Power Company F.C. players
Taiwanese footballers
Association football goalkeepers